Aglaops genialis is a moth in the family Crambidae. It was described by John Henry Leech in 1889. It is found in Japan.

References

Moths described in 1889
Pyraustinae
Moths of Japan